Mohamed Surour (Arabic:محمد سرور) (born 31 October 1993) is an Emirati footballer who plays as a midfielder.

External links

References

Emirati footballers
1993 births
Living people
Sharjah FC players
Al-Wasl F.C. players
Footballers at the 2014 Asian Games
UAE First Division League players
UAE Pro League players
Association football midfielders
Asian Games competitors for the United Arab Emirates